Eksteen is a surname of South African origin, being a variant of the surname Eckstein, which means "cornerstone". Notable people with the surname include:

Cindy Eksteen (born 1977), South African former cricketer
Clive Eksteen (born 1966), South African cricketer
Fred Eksteen (born 1991), South African rugby union player
Leighton Eksteen (born 1994), South African rugby union player
Ryno Eksteen (born 1994), South African rugby union player

See also
Eckstein
Eckstine